The revolutionary sections of Paris were subdivisions of Paris during the French Revolution. They first arose in 1790 and were suppressed in 1795.

History 
At the time of the Revolution, Paris measured 3440 hectares, compared to the 7800 hectares of today. It was bounded to the west by the place de l'Étoile, to the east by the cimetière du Père-Lachaise, to the north by place de Clichy, and to the south by the cimetière du Montparnasse. Under the Ancien Régime, the city had been divided into 21 'quartiers'.

In 1789, with a view to elections to the Estates-General, it was instead divided provisionally into 60 districts. By a decree of 21 May 1790, sanctioned by King Louis XVI on 27 June, the National Constituent Assembly created 48 'sections' ('section' then meaning a territorial and administrative division) to replace the 60 districts. Each section was made up of a civil committee, a revolutionary committee and an armed force.

After the Thermidorian Reaction on 27 July 1794, the sections still played an important role in suppressing the popular uprisings. In 1795, however, they were suppressed by the French Directory, which renamed the areas covered by sections as divisions, then quartiers.

Composition

Civil committee
Each section was headed by a civil committee of 16 members (elected by active citizens in the area covered by the section), the juges de paix (judges) and members intended to act as intermediaries between their section and the Paris Commune. From 1792 onwards, the sections occupied themselves permanently with political questions. On 25 July 1792, the Parisians decided to abolish the distinction between active citizens and passive citizens. As a result, the sections' assemblies sat permanently and became the political organ of the sans-culottes. After the Brunswick Manifesto they demanded the deposition of the king, by 47 sections to 48.

On 9 August 1792 each section delegated commissioners elected by the active and passive citizens, as a replacement for the 'municipalité' of Paris. There were 52 of these commissioners in total (including Jacques-René Hébert, Pierre-Gaspard Chaumette and François-Xavier Audouin) and they triggered the events of 10 August 1792, putting an end to the monarchy and giving rise to the 'Revolutionary Commune' of Paris.

Revolutionary committee
Set up by a law of 21 March 1793, the initial task of the sections' revolutionary committees was surveillance on foreigners without interfering in the lives of French citizens. Their activities towards that end (often going beyond the limits the law of 21 March had placed on them) were enabled by the Law of Suspects of 17 September 1793. They also had the power to make lists and issue arrest warrants. They also had the right to deliver citizenship certificates, all in establishing a direct correspondence with the Committee of General Security.

Armed force
Paris's armed force was headed by a commander in chief and divided into 6 legions, each legion made up of troops from eight sections. The troops of each section had their own commander in chief, second in command and adjutant-major. The companies were made up of 120 to 130 men, being bigger or smaller according to their section's population. A company was commanded by a captain, a lieutenant and two 'sous-lieutenants'. Each section also had a company of artillery (60 men and 2 cannon each). In the Thermidorian Reaction of 27 July 1794, during the fall of Maximilien Robespierre, 18 companies had been sent to the front by order of Lazare Carnot. Of the 30 remaining companies, three were used to keep order – at the National Convention, the Arsenal, and the Temple. Seventeen remaining companies replied to the Commune's appeal during the night of 27–28 July 1794.

References 

History of Paris

1790 establishments in France
1795 disestablishments
1790 events of the French Revolution
1791 events of the French Revolution
1792 events of the French Revolution
1793 events of the French Revolution
1794 events of the French Revolution
1795 events of the French Revolution